Yevgeny Stepanovich Savchenko (born 1950) is a Russian politician, who is currently the Senator of Belgorod Oblast on legislative authority since 22 September 2020. He had served as the governor of Belgorod Oblast in Southern Russia from 1993 to 2020. Savchenko is a member of United Russia.

Savchenko is a supporter of President Putin and won by a clear majority against his communist challenger, Vasily Altukhov in 2003, receiving 61% of the votes. He had previously been elected in 1999, when he won against Vladimir Zhirinovsky. He initiated a campaign against swearing in his district.

References

External links

  Official website
Russian region bans foul language (BBC News)
Washington Post article on his relationship with Yelena Baturina

1950 births
Living people
People from Belgorod Oblast
United Russia politicians
21st-century Russian politicians
Governors of Belgorod Oblast
Recipients of the Order "For Merit to the Fatherland", 3rd class
Members of the Federation Council of Russia (1996–2000)
Members of the Federation Council of Russia (after 2000)